Bordino is a surname. Notable people with the surname include:

Luigi Bordino (1922–1977), Italian Roman Catholic priest 
Pietro Bordino (1887–1928), Italian racecar driver
 (1804–1879), Italian soldier and inventor

See also
Bordini